Alexander Hamilton of Innerwick was a Scottish landowner and supporter of Mary, Queen of Scots.

His home was Innerwick Castle in East Lothian, Scotland, near the village of Innerwick.

He was a son of James Hamilton of Innerwick and Helen Home, a daughter of Mungo Home of Coldingknowes.

In 1568 Mary, Queen of Scots, escaped from Lochleven Castle and made her way to Hamilton. Alexander Hamilton of Innerwick signed the bond made at Hamilton to support Mary. He came "in arrayed battle" to the battle of Langside, where her forces were defeated by Regent Moray.

Regent Moray brought Hamilton of Innerwick and six other Hamilton lairds captured on the battlefield as prisoners to Edinburgh to stand trial in the tolbooth. The lairds were condemned and their hands were bound for execution, but they were given a reprieve and imprisoned in Edinburgh Castle.

He married Isobel Home (died 1591), a daughter of Bartholmew Home of Simprim. Their children included:
 Alexander Hamilton of Innerwick, who married Alison Home. Their daughter Jean Hamilton, married Mark Ker, a son of John Ker of Hirsel, and built a house at Spylaw.
 Elizabeth Hamilton, who married John Maxwell of Calderwood.
 Margaret Hamilton, who married John Murray of Black Barony

References

People of the Scottish Marian Civil War
People from East Lothian